Sanjari  is a village in Dondiluhara tehsil, Durg district, Chhattisgarh, India.

Demographics
In the 2001 India census, the village of Sanjari in Durg district had a population of 2,511, with 1,216 males (48.4%) and 1,295 females (51.6%), for a gender ratio of 1065 females per thousand males.

References

Villages in Durg district